Charles Walter Eriksen (February 4, 1923 – February 16, 2018) was an American psychologist who was the editor of Perception & Psychophysics from 1971 to 1993. Eriksen was a leading academic psychologist researching the field of visual perception. He developed the Eriksen flanker task.

Early life
Eriksen's early life was spent in Omaha, Nebraska. He was keen on fishing, and pranks. He studied at the University of Nebraska, and did a PhD in clinical psychology at Stanford University because the queue for psychology was shorter than the one for physics. His first job in 1950 was at Johns Hopkins University as a clinician and experimenter doing two part times jobs.

Perception
Eriksen's publication of the flanker test has been heavily cited.

References

External links

1923 births
2018 deaths
20th-century American psychologists
University of Nebraska alumni
Stanford University alumni
University of Illinois faculty
Johns Hopkins University people
People from Omaha, Nebraska